Gainford may refer to:
Gainford, Alberta, Canada
Gainford, County Durham, England

See also
Gainford Hall
Baron Gainford